James Gordon Kinvig (19 June 1888 – 31 July 1917) was a New Zealand cricketer, rugby union footballer and soldier.

Life
Kinvig was born in Christchurch and educated at Christchurch Boys' High School, where he was a champion sportsman. He moved to Wellington in about 1909 to work in his father's warehousing business. In 1914 he went to Melbourne for business reasons. He returned to Wellington in 1915.

Kinvig enlisted in the Wellington Regiment in September 1915 and embarked for Suez in May 1916 as a sergeant. After service in France and officer training in England, he was commissioned as a second lieutenant in the Wellington Second Battalion. He served some time in the trenches. Early in the morning of 31 July 1917 he was killed in the attack on La Basse Ville during the Battle of Pilckem Ridge as part of the Battle of Passchendaele.

Cricket career
A right-handed lower-order batsman, left-arm medium-pace bowler and fine fieldsman, Kinvig was a successful player at club level but played only two matches for Wellington. In his first match, against the touring Australians in February 1910, he took 3 for 36 in the Australians' first innings. A few weeks before, opening the bowling for his club Central in senior Wellington cricket, he had taken 5 for 2.

Rugby career
Kinvig played rugby union for Wellington from 1909 to 1913. He was a centre three-quarter with a safe pair of hands, and an accurate left-foot kick in both field play and conversions. He played 26 times for Wellington, scoring eight tries, converting 12 tries, and kicking one penalty goal and one field goal – a total of 53 points.

After his death his family donated a section of land he owned in Karori to the Wellington Rugby Union to be sold and the proceeds used to improve Athletic Park, Wellington.

References

External links
 

1888 births
1917 deaths
People educated at Christchurch Boys' High School
Cricketers from Christchurch
Wellington cricketers
Wellington rugby union players
New Zealand cricketers
New Zealand rugby union players
New Zealand military personnel killed in World War I
Rugby union players from Christchurch
New Zealand Military Forces personnel of World War I
New Zealand Army soldiers